Xia Shuwen; Date of birth unknown, was a Chinese painter during the early  Ming Dynasty (1368–1644).

Little is known of Xia's life other than he lived during the late Yuan and early Ming dynasties.

Notes

References
 Zhongguo gu dai shu hua jian ding zu (中国古代书画鑑定组). 2000. Zhongguo hui hua quan ji (中国绘画全集). Zhongguo mei shu fen lei quan ji. Beijing: Wen wu chu ban she. Volume 10.

Yuan dynasty painters
Ming dynasty painters
Year of death unknown
Year of birth unknown